Melanargia lachesis, the Iberian marbled white, is a butterfly species belonging to the family Nymphalidae.

Distribution 
It can be found on the Iberian Peninsula and the south of France.

Description 
The length of the forewings is 25–28 mm. Seitz- M. lachesis Hbn. (= nemausica Esp.) (38b). Lighter than galathea, even than the lightest forms of the same. The black discocellular anguliform spot of the forewing constricted where it is bent. Hindwing entirely white, apart from the interrupted submarginal band; the base very sparingly dusted, the markings of the underside however shine through in the male. In Spain, Portugal and South France. – The specimens with creamy yellow ground-colour, which are somewhat rarer than the chalky white canigulensis Obth.; from the Pyrenees.

Biology 
The butterflies fly in one generation from June to August.
The larvae feed on various grasses.

References

External links
Butterflies of Europe
Satyrinae of the Western Palearctic

lachesis
Butterflies of Europe